Albyfield is a hamlet in Cumbria, England.

Hamlets in Cumbria
City of Carlisle